The McClugage Bridge carries U.S. Route 150 over Upper Peoria Lake & Peoria Lake in the Illinois River in the US state of Illinois. The bridge's official name honors David H. McClugage, mayor of Peoria from 1937 to 1941. The crossing is actually composed of two bridges, one carrying westbound traffic and one carrying eastbound traffic.

History 

The original span of the McClugage Bridge was designed as a steel cantilever bridge in 1939 to replace the Upper Free Bridge, an existing bridge across a narrow stretch of Upper Peoria Lake. Due to World War II, the bridge was not completed until 1948.

An additional three-lane span of similar style was constructed immediately north of the existing bridge in 1982.  Currently, the northern span carries westbound traffic and the original southern two-lane span carries eastbound traffic.

The southern span was rehabilitated in 2000. During rehabilitation, an accident in 2000 killed three iron workers when scaffolding on the bridge collapsed  into the river. Due to this tragedy, there was an effort to change the name of the bridge to "Ironworkers Memorial Bridge". However, instead of the name change, the iron workers were memorialized by a monument near the bridge that was dedicated in April 2001.

Replacement bridge
In 2019, construction began on replacing the deteriorated eastbound (original) span with a three-lane wide tied-arch bridge, along with a multi-use path on the right side. The new $167 million bridge, originally slated to be completed by the fall of 2023, is now scheduled to open in 2024.

References 

U.S. Route 24
U.S. Route 150
Bridges completed in 1948
Bridges completed in 1982
Bridges of the United States Numbered Highway System
Bridges over the Illinois River
Buildings and structures in Peoria, Illinois
Bridges in Tazewell County, Illinois
Road bridges in Illinois
1948 establishments in Illinois
Steel bridges in the United States
Cantilever bridges in the United States
Bridges in Peoria County, Illinois